Dummy is a 1979 American made-for-television docudrama film starring LeVar Burton and Paul Sorvino. Based on Ernest Tidyman's nonfiction book of the same name, the film dramatizes the life of Donald Lang (portrayed by Burton), an African–American deaf man who was acquitted of the murders of two prostitutes in Chicago, Illinois.

Plot
In 1965, Donald Lang is 19-year old African–American man of Chicago, Illinois who was born deaf. He has a loving mother who struggles to give him as normal an upbringing as possible and a brother and sister who are supportive as well. Due to not being formally taught how to communicate via sign language, Donald communicates with people by demonstrations. Despite his disability, he finds employment on the loading docks of Chicago and wins the respect of his fellow workers. One night after work, Donald visits a neighborhood bar where he leaves with a prostitute. The prostitute is later discovered dead under her friend's porch. Shortly thereafter, Donald is arrested at work and charged with the murder of a prostitute after the prostitute's friend told police that she had seen Lang leave the bar with her.

His case is handled by attorney Lowell J. Myers who is also hearing impaired. Investigating the crime, Myers becomes convinced Donald is innocent and another person committed the murder. Nevertheless, Donald Lang is convicted and sent to a mental institution. After several years of appeals, Myers finally manages to have his client released making an eloquent appeal to the state Supreme Court that a deaf mute is entitled to the same rights as one not impaired. In an ironic conclusion, after a few months of freedom, Lang is again arrested for the murder of a prostitute who was seen with him and was convicted of this murder as well.

Cast
LeVar Burton as Donald Lang; a 19–year old African–American man who is deaf, illiterate and only communicates by demonstrations. Lang, who works at a Chicago loading dock has been charged in the murders of two local prostitutes. He is eventually acquitted of these charges due to his inability to formally communicate.    
Paul Sorvino as Lowell Myers; a deaf attorney who represents Lang. Believing he is innocent, Myers goes through great lengths to prove to the courts by discrediting witnesses and introducing reasonable doubts during Lang's jury trial.   
Brian Dennehy as Ragoti; Lang's boss at the Chicago loading dock. 
Rose Gregorio as Jean Markin
Gregg Henry as Assistant D.A. Smith; assistant prosecutor in the case against Lang. He's looking to prove that despite Lang's disability he should be able to stand trial and prosecuted to the fullest extent of the law.  
Steven Williams as Julius Lang; Lang's older brother who he lives with along with his younger sister in a public housing development. He believes his brother is innocent, telling the attorney that Donald wouldn't hurt a soul. 
Holly Robinson as Genettia Lang, Lang's younger sister whom he lives with along with their older brother.
Frankie Hill and Earnestine Williams, a local prostitute who Lang is accused of killing.      
Helen Martin as Mrs. Harrod, bar patron and friend of Williams, She was the only witness who saw Lang and Williams leave the bar on the night of Williams' death. She ultimately was the person who discovers Williams' body which is lying underneath her back porch. Being the only witness, she dies before Lang's court appearance.

Production
Dummy was filmed completely in Chicago, Illinois in March 1979. Chicago locations in the film includes, Washington Park Homes, a Chicago Housing Authority public housing project at East 44th streets and South Cottage Grove Avenue and Cook County Jail.

Awards and home media
The film won a Peabody Award and was nominated for the Primetime Emmy Award for Outstanding Television Movie. The film was released on DVD by the Warner Archive Collection in October 2011.

See also
List of films featuring the deaf and hard of hearing

References

External links
 

American biographical films
Films set in the 20th century
1979 films
1979 television films
1970s biographical films
Films based on non-fiction books
Films set in Chicago
Films shot in Chicago
Films shot in Illinois
Films set in Illinois
Films directed by Frank Perry
CBS network films
Films about deaf people
1970s English-language films
1970s American films